Bozhidar Ivanov (born 17 September 1956) is a Bulgarian boxer. He competed in the men's light heavyweight event at the 1980 Summer Olympics. At the 1980 Summer Olympics, he lost to Herbert Bauch of East Germany.

References

1956 births
Living people
Bulgarian male boxers
Olympic boxers of Bulgaria
Boxers at the 1980 Summer Olympics
Place of birth missing (living people)
Light-heavyweight boxers